Sandipan Das is an Indian First-class and List A Cricketer currently playing for Bengal. He has played for them in 2012-13 Ranji Trophy and 2013 Vijay Hazare Trophy. He was a part of the 2012 World Cup winning squad of the India Under-19 cricket team. But, he failed to get a chance in the first XI there. Earlier, he had also played for the Cricket Association of Bengal XI.

See also
India U-19
Bengal cricket team

References

Indian cricketers
Bengal cricketers
Cricketers from Kolkata
Living people
1992 births
Cricketers from West Bengal